Nala (Sanskrit: नल) is a character in the Vana Parva book of the Mahabharata. He was the king of Nishadha Kingdom and the son of Veerasena. Nala was known for his skill with horses and for his culinary expertise. He married princess Damayanti, of the Vidarbha Kingdom. He was blessed by goddess Kali. He was also a great cook and wrote the first-ever book on cookery, Pakadarpanam (Sanskrit: पाकदर्पण). He is said to have been able to cook a full meal without lighting fire. Even today, a consistently good chef/cook is credited as someone with Nala-Bhagam to mean that their dish tastes as if Nala has prepared it.

Story

Nala's story is told in the Vana Parva of the Mahabharata and was adapted into various versions. According to the 12th century text Nishadha Charita, one of the five mahakavyas (great epic poems) in the canon of Sanskrit literature, written by Sriharsha, Nala, King of Nishadha, found a beautiful swan in a forest. The swan told him about Damayanti. An impressed Nala told the swan to go to Damayanti and tell her about him. Later, He was chosen by Damayanti as her husband in the swayamvara, a function in which the bride selects her husband from among the invitees, in preference to even the gods who came to marry her.

All the gods left the place praising the qualities of Nala and blessing the couple. But when Kali Purush heard everything from the returning gods, in wrath, vowed to doom the life of Damayanti, since she had chosen a mortal and disregarded them. He vowed to divert Nala from the path of Dharma (the path of righteousness and virtue) and to separate Nala and Damayanti. Such was the purity of Nala that it took twelve years for Kali to find a small fault in him and bewitch his soul. After being influenced by evil, Nala played a game of dice with his brother Pushkara and gambled away his wealth and the kingdom to him. Before departing, Damayanti sent her children to her father's kingdom with a charioteer. Pushkara threatened that any citizen who showed sympathy for them would suffer the penalty of being forced to live in the jungle. While Damayanti was sleeping, Nala, under the influence of Kali, deserted her and went away.

In the jungle, he saved Karkotaka Naga (Snake Person) from a fire. The Karkotaka Naga used poison to transform Nala into an ugly dwarf named Bahuka and advised him to serve King Rituparna of Ayodhya. He also gave Nala a magic garment that would restore him to his original form. Nala went to King Rituparna and served him as both charioteer and cook. Meanwhile, Damayanti when finding her lord not there wept and went ahead in search of him. In her travel, she faced the snake, Nishada, met ascetics who comforted her, met merchant travellers, met her aunt Queen Bhanumati of Chedi, and at last managed to reach her father's kingdom. She declared a reward for anyone who would find the hideout of her husband. One of her scouts returned and told her about a charioteer named Bahuka in a faraway kingdom.

Damayanti sent a riddle to Rituparna to confirm Nala's presence. On hearing that Damayanti was going to marry another husband, Bahuka took Rituparna and drove the chariot fast. He set out for Vidarbha from Ayodhya. During the journey, Kali came out from his body and asked for forgiveness for fear of being cursed. Nala forgave him, and in a few hours reached Bhima's kingdom. Through her servant's help, Damayanti found that charioteer named Bahuka, who was surely her Nala and called him to her apartment. Both recognized each other and Nala took his original form.

Knowing Rituparna's skills at dice and numbers, Nala exchanged his skill as a charioteer for knowledge at dice. Then he set out to regain his kingdom from his brother. Reaching there, he challenged Pushkara for a match either at dice or single combat. Nala staked all the wealth he had earned from his father in law, himself and his wife for the latter's kingdom.

Driven by the desire of gaining a beautiful wife, Pushkara, sure of his own success, accepted a rematch in dice, in which he lost and became a slave. But Nala then forgave him for what he had done and gave him his kingdom back as being of the same blood. After four years of hardship, during which Nala never deviated from the path of righteousness, he had overcome the influence of Kali and regained his kingdom by defeating Pushkara in a rematch. Nala and Damayanti were reunited and lived happily thereafter.

Kali offered Nala a boon when he left him. Nala sought the boon that whoever read his story would not be unduly affected by the malefic effects of Kali.

Nala and Damayanti had two children: a boy named Indrasena, and a girl also named Indrasenaa. The daughter married Mudgala, the king of Panchala

Translations and student editions
 Norman Mosley Penzer translated the tale of Nala and Damayanti in 1926.
 The story of Nala and Damayanti has introduced students to the study of Sanskrit since at least the early 19th century, when Franz Bopp published an introductory text Nalus, carmen sanscritum e Mahabharato edidit, Latine vertit, et adnotationi illustravit, Franciscus Bopp (1819).
 Later, the American Sanskrit scholar Charles Rockwell Lanman used the story of Nala and Damayanti as the first text in his introductory A Sanskrit Reader: Text and Vocabulary and Notes (1883).

See also
 The Story of Nal and Damayanti in Bhakti and Sufism Accounts

References

Further reading
 
 
 Jours d'amour et d'épreuve, l'histoire du roi Nala, pièce de Kathakali (Nalacaritam) de Unnâyi Vâriyar , (XVIIè-XVIIIè siècle), traduction du malayâlam, introduction et notes par Dominique Vitalyos, Gallimard, Connaissance de l'Orient, 1995.

External links 

 The Naishadha-charita (story of Nala and Damayanti) English translation by K. K. Handiqui  [proofread] (includes glossary)
 Hindi Story of Nal Damyanti at ajabgjab.com

 Characters in the Mahabharata